Faber Edmond Chidarikire is the Provincial Governor and resident minister of Mashonaland West, Zimbabwe. He is a member of the ZANU-PF party and an ex officio member of the Senate of Zimbabwe.

Political career

Faber Edmond Chidarikire's political career began in 1994 when he was elected executive mayor of Chinhoyi. He held this office for 4 years before stepping down.

Faber Chidarikire decided to go back to politics and in 2004 he was elected member of parliament for Chinhoyi. He held this office until 13 February 2009 when he was appointed Governor and Resident Minister of Mashonaland West Province.

References

ZANU–PF politicians
Members of the Senate of Zimbabwe
Living people
Zimbabwean businesspeople
People from Mashonaland West Province
Mayors of places in Zimbabwe
Provincial governors of Zimbabwe
Year of birth missing (living people)